I'll Sleep When I'm Dead may refer to:

 "I'll Sleep When I'm Dead", a song from Warren Zevon
 I'll Sleep When I'm Dead (An Anthology), a Warren Zevon compilation album
 I'll Sleep When I'm Dead: The Dirty Life and Times of Warren Zevon, a biography of Warren Zevon
 "I'll Sleep When I'm Dead" (Bon Jovi song)
 I'll Sleep When I'm Dead (2003 film), a British crime drama
 I'll Sleep When I'm Dead (2016 film), a documentary about American DJ Steve Aoki

See also 
 "Sleep When I'm Dead", a 2008 song by The Cure
 "I Can Sleep When I'm Dead", a 2008 song by Jason Michael Carroll
 I'll Sleep When You're Dead, a 2007 album by El-P